The 1993 Halloween Havoc was the fifth annual Halloween Havoc professional wrestling pay-per-view (PPV) event produced by World Championship Wrestling (WCW). It took place on October 24, 1993, from the Lakefront Arena in New Orleans, Louisiana. In 2014, all of WCW's Halloween Havoc PPVs became available on WWE's streaming service, the WWE Network.

Production

Background
Halloween Havoc was an annual professional wrestling pay-per-view event produced by World Championship Wrestling (WCW) since 1989. As the name implies, it was a Halloween-themed show held in October. The 1993 event was the fifth event in the Halloween Havoc chronology and it took place on October 24, 1993, from the Lakefront Arena in New Orleans, Louisiana.

Storylines
The event featured professional wrestling matches that involve different wrestlers from pre-existing scripted feuds and storylines. Professional wrestlers portray villains, heroes, or less distinguishable characters in the scripted events that build tension and culminate in a wrestling match or series of matches.

Event

In the opening match of the pay-per-view, Ice Train, Charlie Norris and The Shockmaster defeated Harlem Heat (Kole and Kane) and The Equalizer, after the Shockmaster powerslammed Kole.

During the opening match it was announced that Paul Orndorff would replace the injured Yoshi Kwan in the second match, against Ricky Steamboat. The Assassin, who came out with Orndorff, put something into his mask and headbutted Steamboat. Steamboat was unable to get up from this and ultimately lost via countout.

In the next match, Lord Steven Regal was defending his WCW World Television Championship against Davey Boy Smith. Regal was able to retain his title after the match ended at a time limit draw, after 15 minutes.

The next match, for the WCW United States Heavyweight Championship, Steve Austin originally thought he defeated Dustin Rhodes, however his feet were on the rope. While Austin was looking for the title, Rhodes was able to roll up Austin and record the pinfall victory. Following the match Austin attacked Rhodes with the belt.

The Nasty Boys (Brian Knobbs and Jerry Sags) next won the WCW World Tag Team Championship from Marcus Alexander Bagwell and 2 Cold Scorpio. Scorpio hit the 450 splash on Knobbs, however he then got attacked by Sags, enabling Knobbs to pin Scorpio.

Next Sting was able to roll up Sid Vicious to pick up the victory.

The second to last match was for the WCW International World Heavyweight Championship. The champion, Rick Rude was able to successfully retain the title against Ric Flair via disqualification. Flair utilized a foreign object on Rude, and as guest referee Terry Taylor began to count the cover by Flair, referee Randy Anderson stopped the match and disqualified Flair.

The main event saw Big Van Vader and  Cactus Jack face off in Spin the Wheel, Make the Deal match with the match type randomly chosen by a spinning wheel. The selected match was a Texas death match, in which after a pin the loser would be unable to stand up following a 10 count. Although Vader held the WCW World Heavyweight Championship, this was a non-title match. Jack received the first fall after clothlining Vader on the ramp, however Vader was able to get to his feet prior to the 10 count. The second fall additionally went to Cactus after jumping off the ramp hitting the elbow on Vader on the floor, however Vader again reached his feet. The third fall went to Vader following a moonsault. The fourth also went to Vader after a DDT onto a chair, however as Jack attempted to get to his feet, Harley Race attacked Jack with a stun gun while the referee's back was turned, enabling Vader to get the win.

Results

References

Professional wrestling in New Orleans
Events in New Orleans
1993 in Louisiana
Halloween Havoc
October 1993 events in the United States
1993 World Championship Wrestling pay-per-view events
Holidays themed professional wrestling events